The 50th NAACP Image Awards ceremony, presented by the NAACP, honored outstanding representations and achievements of people of color in motion pictures, television, music, and literature during the 2018 calendar year. The ceremony took place on March 30, 2019 at the Dolby Theatre, was hosted by Anthony Anderson and broadcast on TV One.

During the ceremony Jay-Z was awarded with the President's Award for "shedding light on the issues that plague the black community including systematic racism and unjust treatment under the law, utilizing his global platform to create everlasting change", and Maxine Waters was awarded with the Chairman's Award "to be an inspiration and one of the most dominant and influential women in politics, a warrior fighting for women's education and social equality". Beyoncé was recognized for the second time as the Entertainer of the Year, becoming the fourth artist to won it twice, joying Whitney Houston (1994,1995), Patti LaBelle ( 1992, 1987) and Dionne Warwick (1988,1986). 

All nominees are listed below, and the winners are listed in bold.

Special Awards

Motion picture

Television

Recording

Outstanding New Artist
 Ella Mai
 Jade Novah
 Koryn Hawthorne
 Omar Wilson
 Tory Lanez

Outstanding Male Artist
 Bruno Mars
 MAJOR.
 John Legend
 Raheem DeVaughn
 Childish Gambino

Outstanding Female Artist
 H.E.R.
 Andra Day
 Janet Jackson
 Ella Mai
 Janelle Monáe

Outstanding Duo, Group or Collaboration
 Kendrick Lamar & SZA – "All the Stars"
 John Legend feat. BloodPop – "A Good Night"
 H.E.R. feat. Bryson Tiller – "Could've Been"
 Bruno Mars feat. Cardi B – "Finesse (Remix)"
 The Carters – "Everything Is Love"

Outstanding Jazz Album
 Jazmin Deborah Ghent – The Story of Jaz
 Christian Sands – Facing Dragons
 Jon Batiste – Hollywood Africans
 Ben Tankard – Rise!
 Camille Thurman – Waiting for the Sunrise

Outstanding Gospel Album – Traditional or Contemporary
 Koryn Hawthorne – Unstoppable
 Tori Kelly – Hiding Place
 Tasha Cobbs Leonard – Heart. Passion. Pursuit. Live at Passion City Church
 Jonathan McReynolds – Make Room
 Jekalyn Carr – One Nation Under God

Outstanding Music Video
 Childish Gambino – "This Is America"
 The Carters – "Apes**t"
 H.E.R. feat. Bryson Tiller – "Could've Been"
 Bruno Mars feat. Cardi B – "Finesse (Remix)"
 Kendrick Lamar & SZA – "All the Stars"

Outstanding Song, Traditional
 Toni Braxton – "Long as I Live"
 Andra Day – "Amen"
 MAJOR. – "Better With You in It"
 Leon Bridges – "Beyond"
 Tori Kelly feat. Kirk Franklin – "Never Alone"

Outstanding Song, Contemporary
 Ella Mai – "Boo'd Up"
 John Legend feat. BloodPop – "A Good Night"
 Bruno Mars feat. Cardi B – "Finesse (Remix)"
 Childish Gambino – "This Is America"
 H.E.R. – "As I Am"

Outstanding Album
 Ella Mai – Ella Mai
 Janelle Monáe – Dirty Computer
 MAJOR. – Even More
 The Carters – Everything Is Love
 H.E.R. – I Used to Know Her: The Prelude

Outstanding Soundtrack/Compilation
 Kendrick Lamar, SZA feat. Various artists – Black Panther: The Album Music From and Inspired By
 Various artists – Greenleaf, Season 3 (Music From the Original TV series)
 Adrian Younge & Ali Shaheed Muhammad – Marvel's Luke Cage Season Two
 Various artists – Insecure Music From the HBO Original Series, Season 3
 Various artists – Spider-Man: Into the Spider-Verse (Soundtrack From & Inspired By the Motion Picture)

References

External links
 NAACP Image Awards official site

NAACP Image Awards
N
N
N
NAACP Image